Hohensee may refer to:

 Mike Hohensee (born 1961), football coach
 Wolfgang Hohensee (born 1927), German composer

Places  
 Hohensee, a suburb of Zemitz, in Mecklenburg-Vorpommern